Katie Rox is a Canadian singer-songwriter from a farm on the outskirts of Airdrie, Alberta, who lives in Vancouver, British Columbia. She performed in the past under the name Katie B.

Career
Katie Rox has previously provided backup vocals for Mandy Moore. She also sings most of the backup vocals on Songs From Instant Star 2, released in April, 2006, by Alexz Johnson, and has a cameo in the Jeremy Fisher video for "Cigarette."

Jakalope
Rox was the original lead singer of Jakalope.  She was asked to be a part of the band when she met Dave "Rave" Ogilvie at The Warehouse Studio (recording studio owned by Bryan Adams) where she was working reception.  After singing just one song, Rox was hired on to be the lead vocalist, as well as writing lyrics and melodies on the first two albums.

Rox was also known for singing the opening credits' theme for Degrassi: The Next Generation in season 4 and 5.

Rox left the band in early 2007.

Katie Rox
In 2007, Rox left Jakalope to pursue her own musical interests.  She summarizes her experience with Jakalope as a time where she "grew as a songwriter, a performer, an artist, and learned many a valuable lesson". Nonetheless, she felt that it was time to follow her heart and go back to her roots.

Rox started a new project under the name Katie Rox. Her album "High Standards" was released on January 15, 2008, which was the start of her new career. Rox released her second record, "Searchlight" in 2009. Her live performance band included members of Beekeeper, Sidney York, and The Matinee.

Sébastien & Katie
Katie teamed up with Sébastien Lefebvre (of Simple Plan) for a three-song EP collaboration entitled "Christmas Etc."  The two wrote and recorded the songs with Sébastien being in Montreal and Katie in Vancouver. The process was documented on a web series called "Write Here, Write There", which can be seen on their YouTube channel.

Nice Horse 
Nice Horse was born when Katie went on a girls’ trip to Hawaii with some friends from the Alberta music scene, where they ended up writing dozens of songs. They decided to join together as a band, with the intention of keeping it a side project that they could only unleash at the Calgary Stampede. But within a year of forming, they were touring the country as Tom Cochrane’s support act. They decided fairly quickly that they needed to take Nice Horse seriously. They released their first EP, A Little Unstable, with producer Jeff Dalziel (Washboard Union, Brett Kissel), along with the legendary Bob Rock (Metallica, Motley Crue) on a couple of tracks. The growing buzz surrounding Nice Horse led them to be named a CMT Fresh Face Feature Artist, accompanied by a world premiere of the video for "Pony Up." Nice Horse released their aptly titled full-length debut album, There Goes The Neighborhood in 2017.

Discography

Nice Horse 

 2017: There Goes the Neighbourhood
 2017: A Little Unstable

Jakalope
2004: It Dreams
2006: Born 4

Solo releases
2008: High Standards
2009: Searchlight
2011: Pony Up
2014: Paper Airplanes

Sébastien & Katie
2010: "Christmas Etc"

References

External links
canoe.ca - Interview with Katie B.
Interview with Katie Rox at TheGATE.ca

Canadian women singers
People from Airdrie, Alberta
Year of birth missing (living people)
Living people
Jakalope members